Synchaeta is a genus of rotifers belonging to the family Synchaetidae.

The genus has a cosmopolitan distribution. It is found in freshwater, marine, brackish, and inland saline habitats.

Species

Species:

Synchaeta arcifera 
Synchaeta atlantica 
Synchaeta bacillifera 
Synchaeta pectinata

References

Ploima